The 47th Annual GMA Dove Awards presentation ceremony was held on October 11, 2016 at the Allen Arena located in Nashville, Tennessee on the campus of Lipscomb University. The ceremony recognized the accomplishments of musicians and other figures within the Christian music industry for the year 2015/2016. The ceremony was produced by the Trinity Broadcasting Network and was hosted by musicians For King & Country and Tye Tribbett. The awards show was broadcast on the Trinity Broadcasting Network on Sunday October 16, 2016.

Performers
The show featured the first performance of DC Talk after a 15-year hiatus. The following were some of the musical artists who performed at the 47th GMA Dove Awards:
Bethel Music
Anthony Brown and Group Therapy
Natalie Grant
Hollyn
Hillsong UNITED
Tamela Mann
TobyMac
Matthew West

Nominees and winners 
This is a complete list of the nominees for the 48th GMA Dove Awards. The winners are in bold.

General

Song of the Year 

 “Brother” 
 (writers) Bear Rinehart, Bo Rinehart (publishers) NeedToBreathe Music, Bear Lee Breathing Music 
 “First” 
 (writers) Hank Bentley, Jason Ingram, Lauren Daigle, Mia Fieldes, Paul Mabury (publishers) All Essential Music, CentricSongs, Open Hands Music, Upside Down Under, Flychild Publishing, Be Essential Songs, So Essential Tunes, Bentley Street Songs 
 “Flawless” 
 (writers) Barry Graul, Bart Millard, Ben Glover, David Garcia, Mike Scheuchzer, Nathan Cochran, Robby Shaffer, Solomon Olds (publishers) Soul Glow Activator Music, 9t One Songs, Universal Music  Brentwood Benson Publishing, D Soul Music, MercyMe Music, Wet As A Fish Music, Ariose Music 
 “Good, Good Father” 
 (writers) Pat Barrett, Tony Brown (publishers) Vamos Publishing, Capitol CMG Parago, Common Hymnal Publishing, Housefires Sounds, Tony Brown Publishing Designee, worshiptogether.com songs, sixsteps Music 
 “Just Be Held” 
 (writers) Bernie Herms, Mark Hall, Matthew West (publishers) My Refuge Music, Atlas Holdings, Highly Combustible Music, House of Story Music Publishing, Be Essential Songs 
 “No Longer Slaves” 
 (writers) Jonathan David Hesler, Brian Johnson, Joel Case (publisher) Bethel Music Publishing  
 “The River” 
 (writers) Colby Wedgeworth, Jordan Feliz, Joshua Silverberg (publishers) CentricSongs, Colby Wedgeworth Music, Capitol CMG Amplifier, Red Red Pop, Fair Trade Music Publishing 
 “Touch The Sky” 
 (writers) Joel Houston, Dylan Thomas, Michael Guy Chislett (publisher) Hillsong Music Publishing 
 “Trust In You” 
 (writers) Lauren Daigle, Michael Farren, Paul Mabury (publishers) CentricSongs, Farren Love And War Publishing, Flychild Publishing, So Essential Tunes, Integrity's Alleluia! Music 
 “Worth” 
 (writer) Anthony Brown (publishers) Tyscot Music, Key Of A Music

Songwriter of the Year (Artist) 

 Chris Tomlin 
 Joel Houston 
 Lauren Daigle 
 Matt Redman 
 Matthew West

Songwriter of the Year (Non-Artist) 

 Bernie Herms
 David Garcia
 Jason Ingram
 Michael Farren 
 Paul Mabury

Contemporary Christian Artist of the Year 

 Casting Crowns, Reunion Records
 Danny Gokey, BMG Rights Management
 for King & Country, Word Entertainment
 Lauren Daigle, Centricity Music
 TobyMac, Forefront Records

Southern Gospel Artist of the Year 

 Ernie Haase & Signature Sound, StowTown Records
 Gaither Vocal Band, Gaither Music Group
 Greater Vision, Daywind Records
 Karen Peck & New River, Daywind Records
 The Perrys, StowTown Records

Gospel Artist of the Year 

 Anthony Brown & group therAPy, Tyscot Records
 Hezekiah Walker, Entertainment One 
 Jonathan McReynolds, Entertainment One 
 Kirk Franklin, Fo Yo Soul Recordings/RCA Records 
 Tasha Cobbs, Motown Gospel

Artist of the Year 

 for KING & COUNTRY, Word Entertainment 
 Hillsong UNITED, Hillsong Music Australia/Sparrow Records 
 Lauren Daigle, Centricity Music 
 Lecrae, Reach Records 
 TobyMac, ForeFront Records

New Artist of the Year 

 Hollyn, Gotee Records
 Jordan Feliz, Centricity Music
 Stars Go Dim, Word Entertainment
 Travis Greene, RCA Inspiration 
 We Are Messengers, Word Entertainment

Producer of the Year 

 Bernie Herms
 David Garcia
 Kirk Franklin
 Wayne Haun 
 (Team) Seth Mosley & Michael X O’Connor

Rap/Hip Hop

Rap/Hip Hop Recorded Song of the Year 

 “Uncomfortable” – Andy Mineo 
 (writers) Gabriel Azucena, Ramon Ibanga Jr., Gabriel Lambirth, Andy Mineo, Kortney Pollard, Joseph Prielozny 
 “No Quit” – Derek Minor
 (writer) Derek Johnson 
 “Can’t Do You” – Lecrae
 (writer) Lecrae Moore 
 “I Just Wanna Know” – NF
 (writers) Nate Feuerstein, Tommee Profitt 
 “Jumped Out The Whip”  Tedashii 
 (writers)  Tedashii Anderson, Gabriel “Gawvi” Azucena

Rap/Hip Hop Album of the Year 

 Uncomfortable – Andy Mineo
 (producers) 42 North, Alex Medina, Black Knight, Daniel Steele, Dirty Rice, Elhae, Gabriel Lambirth, Gawvi, Illmind, Jon Bellion
 Therapy Session – NF
 (producers) Tommee Profitt, David Garcia, The720 
 Church Clothes 3 – Lecrae
 (producers) Black Knight, Epikh Pro, GAWVI, Mykalife, Ryan Righteous, S1 
 This Time Around – Tedashii
 (producers) Gabriel Azucena, Jamaal “Elhae” Jones, Crystal “Crystal Nicole” JohnsonPompey, John “The Kracken” Williams 
 Forward – Flame
 (producers) SPEC, Courtney Orlando, G. Roc

Rock/Contemporary

Rock/Contemporary Recorded Song of the Year 

 “God is On The Move” – 7eventh Time Down 
 (writers) Mikey Howard, Cliff Williams, Ian Eskelin, Tony Wood 
 “Move” – Audio Adrenaline 
 (writers)  Adam Agee, Seth Mosley 
 “Happiness” – NEEDTOBREATHE 
 (writers) Bo Rinehart, Bear Rinehart, Seth Bolt, Josh Lovelace 
 “Take Me Over” – Red
 (writers) Johnny Andrews, Anthony Armstrong, Randy Armstrong, Josh Baker, Michael Barnes,  Rob Graves, Jason McArthur 
 “Live On Forever” – The Afters 
 (writers) Jordan Mohilowski, Dan Ostebo, Matt Fuqua, Josh Havens, Jason Ingram

Rock/Contemporary Album of the Year 

 Cities – Live In New York City – Anberlin
 (producer) Aaron Sprinkle 
 Sound Of The Saints – Audio Adrenaline
 (producers) Seth Mosley, Joshua Silverberg, Nick Baumhardt 
 Dead Man Walking – John Tibbs
 (producer) Ben Shive 
 The Wonderlands: Sunlight & Shadows – Jon Foreman
 (producers) Tyler Strickland, Anton Patzner, Neal Avron, Keith Tutt, Aaron Roche, Dan Brigham, Jeremy Lutito, Jason Morant 
 Surrender – Kutless
 (producer) Aaron Sprinkle

Pop/Contemporary

Pop/Contemporary Recorded Song of the Year 

 “My Story” – Big Daddy Weave
 (writers)  Mike Weaver, Jason Ingram 
 “Just Be Held” – Casting Crowns
 (writers) Mark Hall, Bernie Herms, Matthew West 
 “Good Good Father” – Chris Tomlin
 (writers) Pat Barrett, Tony Brown 
 “Tell Your Heart To Beat Again” – Danny Gokey
 (writers) Bernie Herms, Randy Phillips, Matthew West 
 “The River” – Jordan Feliz
 (writers) Jordan Feliz, Colby Wedgeworth, Joshua Silverberg 
 “Trust In You” – Lauren Daigle
 (writers) Paul Mabury, Michael Farren, Lauren Daigle

Pop/Contemporary Album of the Year 

 Beautiful Offerings – Big Daddy Weave
 (producer) Jeremy Redmon
 Empires – Hillsong UNITED
 (producers) Michael Guy Chislett, Joel Houston
 Be One – Natalie Grant
 (producers) Bernie Herms, Robert Marvin
 Love Riot – Newsboys
 (producers) Mark Needham, Zach Hall, Seth Mosley, Mike X O’Conner
 This Is Not A Test – TobyMac
 (producers) Christopher Stevens, Toby McKeehan, David Garcia

Inspirational

Inspirational Recorded Song of the Year 

 “Pieces” – Bethel Music & Amanda Cook
 (writers) Amanda Cook, Steffany Gretzinger 
 “Let It Be Jesus” – Christy Nockels
 (writers) Chris Tomlin, Jonas Myrin, Matt Redman 
 “Heaven's Shore” – David Phelps
 (writer) David Phelps 
 “O Praise the Name (Anastasis)” – Hillsong Worship
 (writers) Marty Sampson, Benjamin Hastings, Dean Ussher 
 “Till I Met You” – Laura Story
 (writers) Laura Story, Christopher Stevens, Bryan Fowler

Inspirational Album of the Year 

 Brave New World – Amanda Cook
 (producers) Jason Ingram, Paul Mabury, Amanda Cook 
 The Burning Edge of Dawn – Andrew Peterson
 (producers) Gabe Scott, Ben Shive, Joe Causey 
 Walls – Gateway Worship
 (producers) Walker Beach, Josh Alltop, Miguel Noyolla 
 OPEN HEAVEN/ River Wild – Hillsong Worship
 (producer) Michael Guy Chislett
 Hymns II: Shine On Us – Michael W. Smith
 (producers) Kyle Lee, Jim Daneker, Michael W. Smith

Southern Gospel

Southern Gospel Recorded Song of the Year 

 “Jesus Changed Everything” – Ernie Haase & Signature Sound
 (writers) Ernie Haase, Wayne Haun, Joel Lindsey 
 “Jesus Gave Me Water” – Gaither Vocal Band
 (writer) Lucie E. Campbell 
 “I am Blessed” – Karen Peck & New River
 (writers) Karen Peck Gooch, Kenna West, Michael Farren 
 “Keep On” – Perrys
 (writers) Wayne Haun, Joel Lindsey 
 “Jesus, The One” – The Hoppers
 (writer) Paula Stefanovich

Southern Gospel Album of the Year 

 Still – Booth Brothers
 (producers) Jason Webb, Lari Goss, Ronnie Booth, Michael Booth, Jim Brady 
 That Day Is Coming – Collingsworth Family
 (producer) Wayne Haun
 Happy People – Ernie Haase & Signature Sound
 (producers) Ernie Haase, Wayne Haun, Todd Collins
 How We Love – Mark Lowry
 (producers) Mark Lowry, Kevin Williams
 Moments Like These – The Bowling Family
 (producer) Mike Bowling

Bluegrass/Country

Bluegrass Recorded Song of the Year 

 “He’s In Control” – Doyle Lawson & Quicksilver
 (writer) Steve Watts 
 “In The Heat of the Fire” – Flatt Lonesome 
 (writer) Kelsi Harrigill 
 “Life’s Railway to Heaven (with the Oak Ridge Boys)” – Jimmy Fortune
 (writers) Eliza R. Snow, M.E. Abbey 
 “I’ll Fly Away” – Joey + Rory
 (writers) Albert E. Brumley 
 “Leave It All on the Altar – The Isaacs
 (writers) Gloria Gaither, William J. Gaither, Buddy Greene

Country Recorded Song of the Year 

 “Love Covered My Sin” – Doug Anderson 
 (writers) Wayne Haun, Randall Garland, Val Dacus 
 “Small Town Someone (Lunch)” – Jeff & Sheri Easter 
 (writers) Sheri Easter, Kenna Turner West, Jason Cox 
 “I Believe (with The Whites)” – Jimmy Fortune 
 (writer) Jimmy Fortune 
 “He Touched Me” – Joey+Rory 
 (writer) William J. Gaither 
 “Seconds Count” – Shenandoah ft. Karen Peck 
 (writers) Coy Fulmer/Doc Walley

Bluegrass/Country Album of the Year 

 Small Town, Celebrating 30 Years of Music & Marriage – Jeff & Sheri Easter
 (producers) Madison Easter, Greg Cole, Jeff & Sheri Easter
 Hits & Hymns – Jimmy Fortune
 (producer) Ben Isaacs
 Hymns That Are Important To Us – Joey+Rory
 (producers) Rory Lee Feek, Joe West
 Good News Travels Fast – Shenandoah 
 (producers) Bud McGuire, Mike McGuire 
 Shoulders – Wilburn & Wilburn 
 (producers) Ben Issacs, Jonathan Wilburn, Jordan Wilburn

Contemporary Gospel/Urban

Contemporary Gospel/Urban Recorded Song of the Year 

 “Wait On You” – Janice Gaines
 (writers) Janice Gaines, LaShawn Daniels, Jerren Spruill, Jesse Francois, Jenay Daniels 
 “The Way That You Love Me” – Jonathan McReynolds 
 (writers) Chuck Harmony, Claude Kelly 
 “Wanna Be Happy?” – Kirk Franklin 
 (writer) Kirk Franklin 
 “One Way” – Tamela Mann 
 (writer) Eric Dawkins 
 “I’m Good” – Tim Bowman Jr. 
 (writers) Tim Bowman Jr., Rodney Jerkins, Johna Austin, Marvin WInans Jr, Leon Ware, Authur Ross

Urban Worship Recorded Song of the Year 

 “Worth” – Anthony Brown & group therAPy
 (writer) Anthony Brown
 “Fill Me Up” – Tasha Cobbs
 (writer) William Reagan 
 “The Anthem” – Todd Dulaney
 (writers) Henry Seeley, Joth Hunt, Liz Webber 
 “Intentional” – Travis Greene
 (writer) Travis Greene 
 “Spirit Break Out” – William McDowell
 (writers) Ben Bryant, Luke Hellebronth, Myles Dhillon, Tim Hughes

Contemporary Gospel/Urban Album of the Year 

 Masterpiece – Deitrick Haddon
 (producers) Marcus Hodge, Chris Blakk, Deitrick Haddon, Siege Monstracity, Christopher Daniels, Tubbyoung,  David “Dae Dae” Haddon, Calvin Frazier, BlaqSmurph, Jairus Mozee, 
 Life Music: Stage Two – Jonathan McReynolds
 (producers) Warryn Campbell, Darhyl "DJ" Camper Jr., Chuck Harmony, Israel Houghton, Darryl "Lil Man" Howell, India.Arie, Claude Kelly, Aaron Lindsay, Jonathan McReynolds, PJ Morton, Shannon Sanders 
 Fearless – Jonathan Nelson
 (producers) Jonathan Nelson, Phil Thornton
 Losing My Religion – Kirk Franklin
 (producer) Kirk Franklin
 You Shall Live – Marvin Sapp
 (producer) Aaron W. Lindsey

Urban Worship Album of the Year 

 Keys To My Heart – Briana “Bri” Babineaux
 (producer) Korey Bowie 
 Covered: Alive in Asia – Israel Houghton & New Breed
 (producers) Israel Houghton, Kevin Camp 
 One Place Live – Tasha Cobbs
 (producers) VaShawn Mitchell, Tasha Cobbs 
 The Hill – Travis Greene
 (producers) Victor Navejar, Travis Greene 
 Sounds of Revival – William McDowell
 (producers) Clay Bogan III, William McDowell

Traditional Gospel

Traditional Gospel Recorded Song of the Year 

 “Thank You, Thank You Jesus” – Chicago Mass Choir
 (writer) Percy Gray, Jr.
 “Better” – Hezekiah Walker 
 (writers) Jason Clayborn, Hezekiah Walker, Gabriel Hatcher 
 “Level Next” – John P. Kee
 (writer) John P. Kee 
 “It’s Alright, It’s OK feat. Anthony Hamilton” – Shirley Caesar 
 (writers) Courtney Rumble, Stanley Brown 
 “Put A Praise On It” – Tasha Cobbs, 
 (writer) Tasha Cobbs

Traditional Gospel Album of the Year 

 Everyday Jesus – Anthony Brown & group therAPy
 (producers) Dr. Leonard S. Scott, Bryant S. Scott, Anthony Brown, VaShawn Mitchell
 We Give You Praise – Chicago Mass Choir
 (producers) Percy Gray, Jr., Demetrius Banks, Cornelius Doles, Felica Welch, Dr. Feranda Williamson
 WAP New Era – James Hall Worship & Praise
 (producers) James Hall, Troy Chambers, Dr. Kevin Bond 
 Powerful – Japan Mass Choir
 (producer) DA Johnson 
 Level Next– John P. Kee
 (producer) John P. Kee

Worship

Worship Song of the Year 

 “No Longer Slaves” 
 (writers) Jonathan David Hesler, Brian Johnson, Joel Case (publisher) Bethel Music Publishing  
 “Good Good Father” 
 (writers) Pat Barrett, Tony Brown (publishers) Vamos Publishing, Capitol CMG Parago, Common Hymnal Publishing, Housefires Sounds, Tony Brown Publishing Designee, worshiptogether.com songs, sixsteps Music 
 “Touch the Sky”
 (writers) Joel Houston, Dylan Thomas, Michael Guy Chislett (publisher) Hillsong Music Publishing 
 “We Believe”
 (writers) Travis Ryan, Richie Fike, Matt Hooper (publishers) Integrity Worship Music, Integrity's Praise! Music, Life Worship, Travis Ryan Music 
 “Even So Come” 
 (writers) Jess Cates, Jason Ingram, Chris Tomlin (publisher) S. D. G. Publishing, Sixsteps Songs, Worship Together Music, Open Hands Music, So Essential Tunes, Lily Makes Music

Worship Album of the Year 

 Have It All – Bethel Music
 (producers) Chris Greely, Bobby Strand 
 A Live Worship Experience – Casting Crowns
 (producer) Mark A. Miller 
 Here As It Is In Heaven – Elevation Worship
 (producers) Mack Brock, Aaron Robertson 
 Empires – Hillsong United
 (producers) Michael Guy Chislett, Joel Houston 
 Let It Echo – Jesus Culture
 (producer) Jeremy Edwardson

Instrumental

Instrumental Album of the Year 

 Full Tank 2.0 – Ben Tankard
 (producer) Ben Tankard 
 Without Words: Synthesia – Bethel Music
 (producers) Bobby Strand, Chris Greely  
 Piano Lullabies (Vol. 1) – Hillsong Kids Jr.
 (producer) David Andrew 
 Unchanging Grace – Lucid Collection
 (producer) Steve Wingfield 
 Soak – New Life Worship
 (producer) Jonathan Moos

Children's

Children's Music Album of the Year 

 Who’s Got Their Armor On? – Bear Hug Band
 (producers) Neil Godding, Landon Bailey 
 Come Alive – Bethel Music Kids
 (producers) Jason Ingram, Paul Mabury 
 Sing The Bible With Slugs And Bugs, Volume 2 – Randall Goodgame
 (producer) Ben Shive 
 Sweet Dreams – Sandi Patty
 (producer) Steve Wingfield 
 Fun Size, Vol. 1 – Scripture Snacks Kids
 (producer) Jack Shocklee

Youth/Children's Musical of the Year 

 Christmas in Black & White
 (creators) Jeff Slaughter, Jeff Anderson 
 Christmas in Kid City
 (creators) Dave Clark, Emily Mingledorff 
 Legends at Camp Garner Creek
 (creators) Dave Clark, Emily Mingledorff 
 The Kingdom Connection
 (creator) Christy Semsen 
 UNITED – The Modern Youth Choir
 (arranger) Cliff Duren

Spanish Language

Spanish Language Album of the Year 

 Derroche De Amor – Alex Campos
 (producers) Juan David Botello, Alex Campos, Javier Sorano 
 Eterno Live – Christine D’Clario
 (producers) Michael Farren, Christine D’Clario 
 Principio Y Fin – Evan Craft
 (producer) Sean Cook  
 En Esto Creo – Hillsong en Espanol
 (producer) Toni Romero 
 Sigues Siendo Dios En Vivo Desde Argentina – Marcos Witt
 (producer) Marcos Witt 
 Dios Me Ama – Thalles Roberto
 (producer) Aaron Lindsey, Thalles Roberto, Fabio Aposan

Special Event/Other

Special Event Album of the Year 

 Blessed Assurance: The New Hymns of Fanny Crosby – Various
 (producers) Bobby Blazier, John Hartley  
 Let the Glory Come Down – Bill & Gloria Gaither and Friends
 (producers) Geron Davis, Bradley Knight 
 Passion: Salvation's Tide Is Rising – Passion
 (producers) David Crowder, Gabe Scott, Ed Cash, David Garcia, Ross Copperman, Seth Mosley, Nathan Nockels, Shama “Sake Pase, Joseph, Maurice “Jimi Cravity” Willis, Solomon Olds 
 The Passion: New Orleans – Various/The Passion Cast
 (producers) Adam Anders, Peer Astrom 
 We Will Stand – Various
 (producers) Michael Omartian, Dan Posthuma

Christmas Album of the Year 

 Adore: Christmas Songs of Worship (Live) – Chris Tomlin
 (producer) Ed Cash 
 Christmas is Here – Danny Gokey
 (producer) Keith Thomas 
 God with Us – Laura Story
 (producers) Brown Bannister, Cliff Duren, Andrew Osenga 
 O Come Emmanuel – Various
 (producers) Andrew Geer, Kyle Buchanan 
 MercyMe, It’s Christmas! – MercyMe
 (producers) Brown Bannister, Ben Shive

Musical of the Year 

 Bethlehem Morning
 (creators) Russel Mauldin, Sue C. Smith 
 Jesus, Only Jesus
 (creator) Craig Adams 
 That’s Where The Story Begins
 (creators) Dave Clark, Gerald Crabb, Mike Harland 
 This Changes Everything
 (creators) Marty Funderbunrk, Joseph Habedank 
 Under a Starry Sky (A Dramatic Musical for Christmas)
 (creators) Joel Lindsey, Jeff Bumgardner

Choral Collection of the Year 

 Burning Lights – Choral Collection
 (arranger) Cliff Duren 
 Fantasia Noel (Songs of the Season for Choir and Orchestra)
 (arranger & orchestrator) Joshua Spacht
 My Hope (Songs & Message of Billy Graham)
 (arranger) Travis Cottrell 
 Southern Gospel Songs (10 New, Emerging and Classic Hits for Southern Gospel Choir)
 (arranger & orchestrator) Marty Hamby 
 Timeless (Ageless and Enduring Songs of Worship)
 (arrangers) David Wise, David Shipps (orchestrator) David Shipps

Recorded Music Packaging of the Year 

 Have It All – Bethel Music
 (art director) Kiley Goodpasture (graphic artist & photographer) Stephen Hart 
 Come Alive  Bethel Music Kids
 (art director) Kiley Goodpasture (graphic artist & photographer) Stephen Hart (photographer) Justin Posey
 Empires – Hillsong UNITED
 (art directors) Joel Houston, Jay Argaet (graphic artist) Nathan Cahyadi
 Youth Revival – Hillsong Y&F
 (art director) Jay Argaet, Nathan Cahyadi, Nathaniel Redekop 
 O Come Emmanuel – Various
 (graphic artist) The Parable Group

Videos

Short Form Video of the Year 

 Tell Your Heart To Beat Again – Danny Gokey
 (director & producer) Kristen Barlowe
 Be Like Jesus – Deitrick Haddon
 (director) Yolande Geralds (producer) Don Le 
 The Way You Love Me – Jonathan McReynolds
 (director & producer) Derek Blanks
 Mr. Roboto – Rapture Ruckus
 (director & producer) Kyle Dettman 
 Live On Forever – The Afters
 (director & producer) Nathan William

Long Form Video of the Year 

 Come Alive – Bethel Music Kids
 (director) David Noroña (producer)  Kiley Goodpasture
 Neon Porch Extravaganza LIVE – Crowder
 (director) Nathan Corrona (producers) Shelley Giglio, Mike McCloskey  
 Youth Revival – Hillsong Y&F
 (director) Jamin Tasker (producer) Ben Field
 Hymns That Are Important To Us – Joey + Rory
 (director) Daniel Grace (producer) Aaron Carnahan, Joel McAfee, Bill Gaither
 #LetsGo – Planetshakers
 (director) Pete Seamons, Peter John (producer) Russell Evans, Mike Pilmer, Joth Hunt, Josh Brown 
 CCM United – Various 
 (director) Michael Omartian (producer) Stephen Yake

Films

Inspirational Film of the Year 

 God’s Not Dead 2
 (director) Harold Cronk (producer) Pure Flix Productions
 Miracles From Heaven
 (director) Patricia Riggen (producer) TriStar Pictures in association with AFFIRM Films 
 Risen
 (director) Kevin Reynolds (producers) LD Entertainment, AFFIRM Films 
 War Room
 (director) Alex Kendrick (producers) Kendrick Brothers Pictures, AFFIRM Films 
 Woodlawn
 (directors) Andrew Erwin, Jon Erwin (producer) Erwin Brothers Entertainment

References

External links 
 

2016 music awards
GMA Dove Awards
2016 in American music
2016 in Tennessee
GMA